Angela  Davis (born 23 June 1985) is an Australian saxophonist currently residing in Melbourne. Her first release The Art of The Melody received strong reviews in the United States and Australia and was successful on the US Jazz Charts. She is known for her pure sound reminiscent of Lee Konitz (with whom she studied), Art Pepper and Paul Desmond. Davis is a 2014 recipient of the prestigious Brian Boak Bursary in Queensland.

Biography
Angela Davis grew up in Queensland, Australia. She studied at the Queensland Conservatorium under the tutelage of John Hoffman and Steve Newcomb. After graduating with first class honors, Davis went to study for a Masters of Music degree in Philadelphia, Pennsylvania. She has since moved to New York, where she plays in clubs with her own group and as a sideman.

Discography

Awards

AIR Awards
The Australian Independent Record Awards (commonly known informally as AIR Awards) is an annual awards night to recognise, promote and celebrate the success of Australia's Independent Music sector.

|-
| AIR Awards of 2020
| Little Did They Know
| Best Independent Jazz Album or EP
| 
|-

ARIA Music Awards
The ARIA Music Awards is an annual awards ceremony that recognises excellence, innovation, and achievement across all genres of Australian music. They commenced in 1987. 

! 
|-
| 2019
| Little Did They Know
| Best Jazz Album
| 
| 
|-

References

1985 births
Living people
Australian jazz saxophonists
Musicians from Queensland
Women saxophonists
21st-century saxophonists